Ali ibn Muhammad ibn Idris was the fourth Idrisid emir of Morocco.

Life
Ali was the son of Muhammad ibn Idris, whom he succeeded in March/April 836 at the age of nine. During his infancy, the chieftains of the Berber tribes acted as his regents. He proved an able ruler, who managed to stabilize and pacify the Idrisid realm after the troubled reign of his father. During his reign, Idrisid authority was strengthened and stretched from Basra to Tudgha. Some Idrisid troops reportedly also participated in the 846 Sack of Rome by Aghlabid raiders.

Ali died in January 849 at Fes and was succeeded by his brother Yahya I.

Genealogy

References

Sources
 
 

Idrisid emirs
9th-century Arabs
Moroccan people of Arab descent
People from Fez, Morocco
849 deaths
9th-century monarchs in Africa
827 births
9th-century Moroccan people
Medieval child monarchs